The Daily Telegram is a daily newspaper published Sundays through Fridays in Adrian, Michigan, United States. Former owner GateHouse Media acquired the paper from Independent Media Group in 2000.

The newspaper covers all of Lenawee County and southern Jackson County, including "Adrian, Tecumseh, Blissfield, Clinton, Addison, Deerfield, Hudson, Morenci, Onsted, Brooklyn and all points in between."

Upon the founding of the Telegram in December 1892, inaugural publishers M.W. Redfield and Elmer E. Putnam said "particular attention will be given to events of a local nature."

Initially named the Evening Telegram, the newspaper took the name of its hometown in 1898, becoming the Adrian Daily Telegram, changing its name again to become The Daily Telegram in 1973.

The Adrian Daily Telegram suspended publication from October 24, 1972, to January 5, 1973, because of a strike.

References

External links 
 
 GateHouse Media

Gannett publications
Newspapers published in Michigan
Lenawee County, Michigan
Publications established in 1892